Lynette Frances Williams  (born 1947) is an Australian educator and musician who held the position of Principal of the Guildhall School of Music and Drama from 2017 to 2021. Prior to taking up her role at Guildhall, she was CEO of Australia's National Institute of Dramatic Art and was the director of the Culture, Ceremonies and Education Programme for the London 2012 Olympic Games.

Williams originally trained as a classical singer at the Sydney Conservatorium of Music. She was appointed Member of the Order of Australia in the 2019 Australia Day Honours.

References

1947 births
Living people
Sydney Conservatorium of Music alumni
Members of the Order of Australia
Academics of the Guildhall School of Music and Drama
Australian academic administrators